The 2015–16 BYU Cougars women's basketball team will represent Brigham Young University during the 2015–16 college basketball season. It will be head coach Jeff Judkins fifteenth season at BYU. The Cougars, members of the West Coast Conference, play their home games at the Marriott Center. They enter the season as defending WCC Tournament champions. They finished the season 26–7, 16–2 in WCC play to WCC win regular title. They advanced to the championship game of the WCC women's tournament where they lost to San Francisco. They received an at-large bid to the NCAA women's tournament where they lost to Missouri in the first round.

Before the season

Departures

Recruiting

2015-16 Class
The 2015-16 recruiting class information will be posted as soon as it becomes available.

Future Classes
New Cougar teammates for the 2016-17 season and beyond will be announced throughout the season. They will be posted here when they are announced.

2015–16 media

BYU Radio Sports Network Affiliates

All Lady Cougar games that don't conflict with men's basketball or football games will be featured live on BYU Radio, found nationwide on Dish Network 980, on Sirius XM 143, and online at www.byuradio.org. Home games will be a BYUtv simulcast while road games will be voiced by Robbie Bullough. Select home games and road games will air on TheW.tv.

Roster

Schedule

|-
!colspan=8 style="background:#002654; color:white;"| Exhibition

|-
!colspan=8 style="background:#002654; color:white;"| Non-conference regular season

|-
!colspan=8 style="background:#002654; color:white;"| WCC regular season

|-
!colspan=8 style="background:#002654;"| 2016 WCC Tournament

|-
!colspan=8 style="background:#002654;"| NCAA Women's Tournament

All BYUtv games, minus the home game vs. Gonzaga, were simulcast on BYU Radio with the BYUtv announcers, listed below. Select other games, listed with an x, were broadcast on BYU Radio with Robbie Bullough on the call. The WCC Championship was also on BYU Radio with Dave McCann & Blaine Fowler providing the call.

Game Summaries

Exhibition: Fort Lewis College
Broadcasters: Robbie Bullough & Ashley Garfield
Starting Lineups:
Ft. Lewis: Astrea Reed, Michelle Turner, Kate Bayes, Kylie Santos, Mary Rambo
BYU: Kylie Maeda, Lexi Rydalch, Makenzi Pulsipher, Kalani Purcell, Micaelee Orton

Utah Valley
Broadcasters: Spencer Linton, Kristen Kozlowski, & Jason Shepherd
Series History: BYU leads series 5–0
Starting Lineups:
Utah Valley: Mariah Seals, Georgia Agnew, Rhaiah Spooner-Knight, Taylor Gordon, Sam Loggins
BYU: Kylie Maeda, Lexi Rydalch, Makenzi Pulsipher, Kalani Purcell, Micaelee Orton

Oklahoma
Broadcasters: Bob Carpenter & Dan Hughes
Series History: Oklahoma leads series 3–1
Starting Lineups:
BYU: Kylie Maeda, Lexi Rydalch, Makenzi Pulsipher, Kalani Purcell, Micaelee Orton
Oklahoma: Peyton Little, Derica Wyatt, Gabbi Ortiz, Maddie Manning, Kaylon Williams

Colorado State
Broadcaster: Matt Wozniak
Series History: BYU leads series 54–22
Starting Lineups:
BYU: Kylie Maeda, Lexi Rydalch, Makenzi Pulsipher, Kalani Purcell, Micaelee Orton
Colorado State: Keyora Wharry, Emilie Hesseldal, Ellen Nystrom, Jamie Patrick, Elin Gustavsson

Utah State
Broadcasters: Spencer Linton, Kristen Kozlowski, & Jason Shepherd
Series History: BYU leads series 33–3
Starting Lineups:
Utah State: Victoria Price, Funda Nakkasoglu, Rachel Brewster, Katie Toole, Deja Mason
BYU: Kylie Maeda, Lexi Rydalch, Makenzi Pulsipher, Kalani Purcell, Micaelee Orton

Thanksgiving Classic: Georgia
Series History: First Meeting
Starting Lineups:
BYU: Kylie Maeda, Amanda Wayment, Lexi Rydalch, Makenzi Pulsipher, Kalani Purcell
Georgia: Tiaria Griffin, Merritt Hempe, Shacobia Barbee, Marjorie Butler, Mackenzie Engram

Thanksgiving Classic: Penn State
Series History: First Meeting
Starting Lineups:
BYU: Kylie Maeda, Lexi Rydalch, Makenzi Pulsipher, Kalani Purcell, Jasmine Moody
Penn State: Candice Agee, Keke Sevillian, Teniya Page, Kaliyah Mitchell, Peyton Whitted

Tom Weston Invitational: BYU-Hawaii
Broadcaster: Myck Miller
Series History: BYU leads series 3–0
Starting Lineups:
BYU: Kylie Maeda, Lexi Rydalch, Makenzi Pulsipher, Kalani Purcell, Jasmine Moody
BYU-Hawaii: Celeste Claw, Devyn Kauhi, Valerie Nawahine, Emily Nelson, Kjirsten Nelson

Tom Weston Invitational: Hawaii
Broadcaster: Myck Miller
Series History: Hawaii leads series 7–4
Starting Lineups:
Hawaii: Sarah Toeaina, Ashleigh Karaitiana, Kalei Adolpho, Connie Morris, Destiny King
BYU: Kylie Maeda, Lexi Rydalch, Makenzi Pulsipher, Kalani Purcell, Jasmine Moody

Tom Weston Invitational: Texas A&M
Broadcasters: Myck Miller
Series History: First Meeting
Starting Lineups:
Texas A&M: Khaalia Hillsman, Courtney Williams, Jasmine Lumpkin, Jordan Jones, Courtney Walker
BYU: Kylie Maeda, Lexi Rydalch, Makenzi Pulsipher, Kalani Purcell, Jasmine Moody

Weber State
Broadcaster: Tyson Ewing
Series History: BYU leads series 42–9
Starting Lineups:
BYU: Kylie Maeda, Lexi Rydalch, Makenzi Pulsipher, Kalani Purcell, Jasmine Moody
Weber State: Jocelyn Adams, Deeshyra Thomas, Kailie Quinn, Brittney Dunbar, Regina Okoye

Utah
Broadcasters: Spencer Linton, Kristen Kozlowski, & Jason Shepherd
Series History: Utah leads series 62–41
Starting Lineups:
Utah: Malia Nawahine, Emily Potter, Paige Crozon, Danielle Rodriguez, Tanaeya Boclair
BYU: Kylie Maeda, Lexi Rydalch, Makenzi Pulsipher, Kalani Purcell, Jasmine Moody

San Diego
Broadcasters: Paula Bott & Susie Erpelding-Barosso
Series History: BYU leads series 8–2
Starting Lineups:
BYU: Kylie Maeda, Lexi Rydalch, Makenzi Pulsipher, Kalani Purcell, Jasmine Moody
San Diego: Malina Hood, Maya Hood, Katherine Hamilton, Cori Woodward, Sydney Williams

Saint Mary's
Broadcasters: Spencer Linton, Kristen Kozlowski, & Jason Shepherd
Series History: BYU leads series 6–4
Starting Lineups:
Saint Mary's: Lauren Nicholson, Sydney Raggio, Stella Beck, Devon Brookshire, Samira McDonald
BYU: Kylie Maeda, Lexi Rydalch, Makenzi Pulsipher, Kalani Purcell, Jasmine Moody

Pacific
Broadcasters: Spencer Linton, Kristen Kozlowski, & Jason Shepherd
Series History: BYU leads series 9–2
Starting Lineups:
Pacific: Emily Simons, GeAnna Luaulu-Summers, Desire Finnie, Hailie Eackles, Najah Queenland
BYU: Kylie Maeda, Lexi Rydalch, Makenzi Pulsipher, Kalani Purcell, Jasmine Moody

Santa Clara
Broadcaster: Doug Greenwald
Series History: BYU leads series 10–1
Starting Lineups:
BYU: Kylie Maeda, Lexi Rydalch, Makenzi Pulsipher, Kalani Purcell, Jasmine Moody
Santa Clara: Taylor Berry, Marie Bertholdt, Lori Parkinson, Savanna Hanson, Morgan McGwire

San Francisco
Broadcaster: George Devine
Series History: BYU leads series 13–2
Starting Lineups:
BYU: Kylie Maeda, Lexi Rydalch, Makenzi Pulsipher, Kalani Purcell, Jasmine Moody
San Francisco: Zhane Dikes, Rachel Howard, Michaela Rakova, Taylor Proctor, Kalyn Simon

Gonzaga
Broadcasters: Spencer Linton, Kristen Kozlowski, & Jason Shepherd
Series History: Gonzaga leads series 11–7
Starting Lineups:
Gonzaga: Chelsea Waters, Georgia Striton, Emma Stach, Kiara Kudron, Shelby Cheslek
BYU: Kylie Maeda, Lexi Rydalch, Makenzi Pulsipher, Kalani Purcell, Jasmine Moody

Portland
Broadcasters: Spencer Linton, Kristen Kozlowski, & Jason Shepherd
Series History: BYU leads series 16–4
Starting Lineups:
Portland: Kaylie Van Loo, Hannah Mattson, Ellie Woerner, Julie Spencer, Ashley Gray
BYU: Kylie Maeda, Lexi Rydalch, Makenzi Pulsipher, Kalani Purcell, Jasmine Moody

Loyola Marymount
Broadcasters: Spencer Linton, Kristen Kozlowski, & Jason Shepherd
Series History: BYU leads series 10–1
Starting Lineups:
LMU: Andee Velasco, Deanna Johnson, Sophie Taylor, Leslie Lopez-Wood, Bree Alford
BYU: Kylie Maeda, Lexi Rydalch, Makenzi Pulsipher, Kalani Purcell, Jasmine Moody

Pepperdine
Broadcasters: Spencer Linton, Kristen Kozlowski, & Jason Shepherd
Series History: BYU leads series 10–2
Starting Lineups:
Pepperdine: Paige Fecske, Erica Ogwumike, Olivia Ogwumike, Kelsey Brockway, Keitra Wallace
BYU: Kylie Maeda, Lexi Rydalch, Makenzi Pulsipher, Kalani Purcell, Jasmine Moody

Loyola Marymount
Broadcasters: Dalton Green & Hunter Patterson
Series History: BYU leads series 11–1
Starting Lineups:
BYU: Kylie Maeda, Lexi Rydalch, Makenzi Pulsipher, Kalani Purcell, Jasmine Moody
LMU: Andee Velasco, Deanna Johnson, Sophie Taylor, Leslie Lopez-Wood, Bree Alford

Pepperdine
Broadcaster: Jane Carson
Series History: BYU leads series 11–2
Starting Lineups:
BYU: Kylie Maeda, Lexi Rydalch, Makenzi Pulsipher, Kalani Purcell, Jasmine Moody
Pepperdine: Paige Fecske, Erica Ogwumike, Kayla Blair, Allie Green, Kelsey Brockway

Pacific
Broadcaster: Don Gubbins
Series History: BYU leads series 10–2
Starting Lineups:
BYU: Kylie Maeda, Lexi Rydalch, Makenzi Pulsipher, Kalani Purcell, Jasmine Moody
Pacific: Emily Simons, GeAnna Luaulu-Summers, Desire Finnie, Hailie Eackles, Najah Queenland

Saint Mary's
Broadcaster: Elias Feldman
Series History: BYU leads series 7–4
Starting Lineups:
BYU: Kylie Maeda, Lexi Rydalch, Makenzi Pulsipher, Kalani Purcell, Jasmine Moody
Saint Mary's: Lauren Nicholson, Devon Brookshire, Megan McKay, Devyn Galland, Samira McDonald

San Francisco
Broadcasters: Spencer Linton, Kristen Kozlowski, & Jason Shepherd
Series History: BYU leads series 14–2
Starting Lineups: 
San Francisco: Zhane Dikes, Rachel Howard, Michaela Rakova, Anna Seilund, Taylor Proctor
BYU: Kylie Maeda, Lexi Rydalch, Makenzi Pulsipher, Kalani Purcell, Jasmine Moody

Santa Clara
Broadcasters: Spencer Linton, Kristen Kozlowski, & Jason Shepherd
Series History: BYU leads series 11–1
Starting Lineups:
Santa Clara: Taylor Berry, Marie Bertholdt, Lori Parkinson, Savanna Hanson, Morgan McGwire
BYU: Kylie Maeda, Lexi Rydalch, Makenzi Pulsipher, Kalani Purcell, Jasmine Moody

San Diego
Broadcasters: Spencer Linton, Kristen Kozlowski & Jason Shepherd
Series History: BYU leads series 8–3
Starting Lineups:
San Diego: Malina Hood, Maya Hood, Katherine Hamilton, Cori Woodward, Sydney Williams
BYU: Kylie Maeda, Lexi Rydalch, Makenzi Pulsipher, Kalani Purcell, Jasmine Moody

Portland
Broadcasters: Cody Barton & Lindsey Gregg
Series History: BYU leads series 17–4
Starting Lineups:
BYU: Kylie Maeda, Lexi Rydalch, Makenzi Pulsipher, Kalani Purcell, Jasmine Moody
Portland: Kaylie Van Loo, Ellie Woerner, Julie Spencer, Darian Slaga, Ashley Gray

Gonzaga
Broadcasters: Sam Adams & Stephanie Hawk-Freeman
Series History: Gonzaga leads series 11–8
Starting Lineups:
BYU: Kylie Maeda, Lexi Rydalch, Makenzi Pulsipher, Kalani Purcell, Jasmine Moody
Gonzaga: Chelsea Waters, Georgia Striton, Jill Barta, Shaniqua Nilles, Shelby Cheslek

BYU vs. Pepperdine
Broadcasters: Spencer Linton & Kristen Kozlowski
Series History: BYU leads series 12–2
Starting Lineups:
Pepperdine: Paige Fecske, Devin Stanback, Allie Green, Yasmine Robinson-Bacote, Kelsey Brockway
BYU: Kylie Maeda, Lexi Rydalch, Makenzi Pulsipher, Kalani Purcell, Jasmine Moody

BYU vs. Santa Clara
Broadcasters: Dave McCann & Blaine Fowler
Series History: BYU leads series 12–1
Starting Lineups:
Santa Clara: Taylor Berry, Marie Bertholdt, Lori Parkinson, Savanna Hanson, Morgan McGwire
BYU: Kylie Maeda, Lexi Rydalch, Makenzi Pulsipher, Kalani Purcell, Jasmine Moody

WCC Championship: BYU vs. San Francisco
Broadcasters: Roxy Bernstein & Chiney Ogwumike
Series History: BYU leads series 15–2
Starting Lineups: 
San Francisco: Zhane Dikes, Rachel Howard, Michaela Rakova, Anna Seilund, Taylor Proctor
BYU: Kylie Maeda, Lexi Rydalch, Makenzi Pulsipher, Kalani Purcell, Jasmine Moody

NCAA First Round: Missouri
Broadcasters: Lowell Galindo & Nell Fortner
Series History: Missouri leads series 5–0
Starting Lineups:
Missouri: Morgan Stock, Sophie Cunningham, Lindsey Cunningham, Cierra Porter, Jordan Frericks
BYU: Kylie Maeda, Lexi Rydalch, Makenzi Pulsipher, Kalani Purcell, Micaelee Orton

Rankings

See also
2015–16 BYU Cougars men's basketball team
BYU Cougars women's basketball

References

BYU Cougars women's basketball seasons
BYU
BYU
BYU Cougars
BYU Cougars